Semmering is a town in the district of Neunkirchen in the Austrian state of Lower Austria. It is noted for its skiing, and has hosted the Alpine skiing World Cup several times. When the Semmering Railway was completed in 1854, the town quickly became a popular tourist getaway in winter months. In 2011, the town had a permanent population of 571.

Population

Resort

History of the resort
At the turn of the 19th and 20th centuries, the better Viennese society discovered the Semmering as a nearby summer resort - destination.

The town was revived with the construction of the Semmering Railway, which opened 1854.

Location
Semmering is located on the border of Lower Austria and Styria at an elevation of 1,000 m (3,280 ft) above sea level and surrounded with forest. Semmering city is located in Neunkirchen, about 100 km (60 mi) from Vienna.

Winter season
As usual, winter season starts in December and lasts until mid-April. The Semmering resort in winter is a ski village with:
 14 km slopes for daytime skiing (3 out of them for beginners, 10 - intermediate, 1 - black)
 13 km slopes for night skiing (Semmering has one of the best lighting system in Europe)
 12 km slopes available for racing ski
 toboggan run of 3 km
 Split Park
 Vertical height up to 400 m (1,310 ft).

 Semmering is famous for its alpine skiing, and has hosted the World Cup races several times.
 Semmering railway was listed as World Heritage Site of UNESCO in 2005.

Sports
Semmering has hosted FIS Alpine Skiing World Cup competitions several times, sometimes during evenings in illuminated slopes. The events have usually attracted many spectators.

References

External links 

 
 Pictures of Semmering and information in English language

Cities and towns in Neunkirchen District, Austria
Fischbach Alps